Igor Čerina (born 10 October 1988) is a Croatian professional footballer who plays as a centre back or defensive midfielder for Dugopolje in Druga HNL.

Career

Youth
Igor went through all stages of Hajduk Split youth system, before starting his senior career with NK Solin.

Croatia & Macedonia

With more than 150 caps with NK Solin, and the Croatian Second Football League title with NK Dugopolje, Igor was signed by top flight Macedonian club FK Rabotnicki. After a short spell with FK Rabotnicki, Igor is coming back as a captain to NK Solin for one more season.

Singapore
Through a recommendation of former Tampines Rovers coach Nenad Baćina Igor is making a move to Hougang United, where he soon obtains captaincy. Igor will then lead the team to club's best S-League position in history. After two successful years with Hougang United Igor was offered a contract with AFC Cup contender Balestier Khalsa, where he spent one year and was picked for S-League team of the season.

Malaysia
In January 2016, Igor was signed by Malaysia Premier League club Sabah FA. Igor had a great first season in Sabah, scoring 10 goals in the process. Subsequently, he was given captaincy for the 2017/2018 campaign. In June 2017, Igor sustained an injury that would keep him out for a couple of months. Towards the end of the season, club's structure has changed. Due to club's new administration inherited financial problems and debt towards their captain, at end of 2018 season without solution at sight, Igor decides to terminate his contract where the club has to compensate for the damage.

Return to Croatia
After unpleasant treatment and contract breakup with Sabah FA, Igor decided to go back home. He was instantly offered a contract at his home club Dugopolje where he has a contract until the end of 2018/2019 season.

External links 
  Singapore's best European imports
  Goal.com Profile
  FourFourTwo Player of the Season
  ESPN Asia S.League Team of the Season

1988 births
Living people
Association football central defenders
Croatian footballers
NK Solin players
NK Dugopolje players
FK Rabotnički players
Hougang United FC players
Balestier Khalsa FC players
Sabah F.C. (Malaysia) players
First Football League (Croatia) players
Croatian Football League players
Singapore Premier League players
Malaysia Premier League players
Croatian expatriate footballers
Expatriate footballers in Singapore
Croatian expatriate sportspeople in Singapore
Expatriate footballers in Malaysia
Croatian expatriate sportspeople in Malaysia